Grevillea aneura, commonly known as Red Lake grevillea, is a species of flowering plant in the family Proteaceae and is endemic to Western Australia. It is a dense, prickly shrub with sharply-pointed, deeply divided leaves and light yellow to reddish flowers.

Description

Taxonomy
Grevillea aneura was first formally described in 1986 by Donald McGillivray in his book New Names in Grevillea (Proteaceae). The specific epithet (aneura) means "without nerves", referring to the phyllodes.

Distribution and habitat
Red Lake grevillea grows in heath and mallee scrub between Lake King and south of Salmon Gums in the Esperance Plains and Mallee biogeographic regions of south-western Western Australia.

Conservation status
Grevillea aneura is classified as "Priority Four" by the Government of Western Australia Department of Biodiversity, Conservation and Attractions, meaning that is rare or near threatened.

References

aneura
Proteales of Australia
Flora of Western Australia
Taxa named by Donald McGillivray
Plants described in 1986